Burnley Football Club is an English professional association football club based in the town of Burnley, Lancashire. Founded on 18 May 1882, the club was one of the first to become professional (in 1883), putting pressure on the Football Association (FA) to permit payments to players. In 1885, the FA legalised professionalism, so the team entered the FA Cup for the first time in 1885–86, and were one of the twelve founding members of the Football League in 1888–89. Burnley have played in all four professional divisions of English football from 1888 to the present day. The team have been champions of England twice, in 1920–21 and 1959–60, have won the FA Cup once, in 1913–14, and have won the FA Charity Shield twice, in 1960 and 1973. Burnley are one of only five teams to have won all four professional divisions of English football, along with Wolverhampton Wanderers, Preston North End, Sheffield United and Portsmouth. They were the second to achieve this by winning the Fourth Division in the 1991–92 season.

Jerry Dawson holds the record for the greatest number of appearances for Burnley. Between 1907 and 1929, the goalkeeper played 569 times for the club. George Beel scored 188 goals during his Burnley career and is the club's record goalscorer. Seven players who have made at least 100 appearances for Burnley went on to manage the team: Jimmy Adamson, Frank Casper (also as caretaker manager), Steve Davis (as caretaker manager), Adrian Heath (as player-manager), Brian Laws, Brian Miller, and Harry Potts. Potts became the club's longest serving manager with 728 competitive matches. During his playing career, Adamson won the Footballer of the Year award in 1962—the only time a Burnley player has won this award. Northern Irishman Willie Irvine is the only player in the club's history to be crowned top goal scorer of the first tier (in 1965–66). When Bob Kelly moved from Burnley to Sunderland for £6,500 in 1925 (equivalent to £ in ), he broke the world transfer record.

All players who have played 100 or more first-team matches for the club, either as a member of the starting eleven or as a substitute, are listed below. Each player's details include the duration of his career with Burnley, his typical playing position while with the club, and the number of matches played and goals scored in all senior competitive matches.

Key
Statistics are correct as of the match played on 13 November 2022.
Players are initially arranged by alphabetical order of surname.
Appearances as a substitute are included. This feature of the game was introduced in the Football League at the start of the 1965–66 season.
Total appearances and goals comprise those in the Football League, including test matches and play-offs, Premier League, FA Cup, Football League Cup, Charity Shield, European Cup, Inter-Cities Fairs Cup, UEFA Europa League, Texaco Cup, Watney Cup, Anglo-Scottish Cup, Football League Group Cup, and Associate Members' Cup / Football League Trophy. Wartime fixtures and expunged matches are not included.

List of players

See also
List of Burnley F.C. internationals

Footnotes

References
Specific

General

 
Burnley
Association football player non-biographical articles